Slim Belkhodja (born 23 November 1962) is a Tunisian chess Grandmaster (2002).

Career
In 1985, he won the 58th Paris City Chess Championship. In 2001, he came first in the Arab Chess Championship. He took part in the FIDE World Chess Championship 2002, but was knocked out in the first round by Rafael Vaganian. In 2004, he tied for first place with Murtas Kazhgaleyev in the 27th Syre Memorial in Issy les Moulineaux. He played in the Chess World Cup 2005 and was knocked out in the first round by Sergei Tiviakov.

Belkhodja played for Tunisia in the Chess Olympiads of 1982, 1984, 2002, 2004, 2006 and 2008.

References

External links

1962 births
Living people
Chess grandmasters
Chess Olympiad competitors
Tunisian chess players
20th-century Tunisian people
21st-century Tunisian people